Praseodymium(IV) fluoride (also praseodymium tetrafluoride) is a binary inorganic compound, a highly oxidised metal salt of praseodymium and fluoride with the chemical formula PrF4. It forms light yellow crystals.

Synthesis
Praseodymium(IV) fluoride can be prepared by the effect of krypton difluoride on praseodymium(IV) oxide:

Praseodymium(IV) fluoride can also be made by the dissolution of sodium hexafluoropraseodymate(IV) in liquid hydrogen fluoride:

Properties
Praseodymium(IV) fluoride forms light yellow crystals. The crystal structure is anticubic and isomorphic to that of uranium tetrafluoride UF4.

Decomposes when heated:

Due to the high normal potential of the tetravalent praseodymium cations (Pr3+ / Pr4+: +3.2 V), praseodymium(IV) fluoride decomposes in water, releasing oxygen, O2.

See also
Praseodymium(III) fluoride
Uranium tetrafluoride

References

Fluorides
Praseodymium compounds
Inorganic compounds
Lanthanide halides